The Department of Justice is the current Western Australian government department responsible for the provision of high quality and accessible justice, legal, registry, guardianship and trustee services to meet the needs of the community and the Western Australian Government.

History

The original Department of Attorney General existed between 1891 and 1909.

The subsequent department between 1909 and 1993 was named the Crown Law Department and was the longest lasting entity under the one name.

In 1993 the Ministry of Justice was formed by the amalgamation of the former Corrective Services and Crown Law Departments and the Youth Justice Bureau, as well as some of the functions of the Ministry of Consumer Affairs. During which time, the Ministry of Justice formed an SDA with the Department of Infrastructure, Regional Development and Cities in order to provide the administration of justice to the external territories of Christmas Island and Cocos (Keeling) Islands.

Then it was changed to the Department of Justice between 2001 and 2006.

On 1 February 2006, the Department of Justice was abolished, and functions of the department passed to two newly formed departments: the Department of the Attorney General and the Department of Corrective Services.

On 1 July 2017, the Department of the Attorney General and the Department of Corrective Services were amalgamated to form the Department of Justice, as part of the Machinery of Government changes introduced earlier that year.

Sub-departments
The current department in its structure has multiple sub departments:
 Policy & Aboriginal Services – "Develops policy and legislation for the Government and information for Departmental business areas. Aboriginal mediation. Aboriginal justice."
 Court and Tribunal Services – "Courts, tribunals and boards, victim support, court security, fines enforcement, justices of the peace."
 Parliamentary Counsel's Office – "Legislative drafting services to Government."
 Office of the Public Advocate – "Advocacy, guardianship and community education services on behalf of people with decision-making disabilities."
 Public Trustee – "Trustee services to WA community."
 Registry of Births, Deaths, & Marriages – "Creates and stores birth, death and marriage records; conducts civil marriages."
 State Solicitor's Office – "Legal Services to Government."
 Corporate Services – "Asset and contract management, business services, financial management, human resources, information services."

Solicitor General
The principal legal adviser to the Attorney General is the Solicitor-General who is described as the second law officer of the State. The Office of the Solicitor General was created with the Solicitor General Act (1969).

While the Attorney General is a political appointment, the Solicitor General is an independent position.  The Attorney General may delegate functions to the Solicitor General.

On 10 October 2018, Joshua Thomson  was appointed Solicitor General for a term of 5 years.  He replaced Peter Quinlan , who was appointed Chief Justice of Western Australia.

Preceding and related agencies

Preceding and related agencies.

 Ministry of Justice (1 January 1993 – 1 July 2001)
 Crown Law Department (1 January 1909 – 1 January 1993)
 Department of Corrective Services (3 April 1987 – 1 January 1993)
 Prisons Department (1 August 1982 – 1 April 1987)
 Department of Corrections (1 January 1971 – 1 August 1982)
 Prisons Department (1 January 1947 – 1 January 1971)
 Gaols Department (1 January 1890 – 1 January 1947)
 Department of the Attorney General (1 February 2006 – 1 July 2017)
 Department of Corrective Services (1 February 2006 – 1 July 2017)

References

Further reading
 Department of the Attorney General Annual Report 2010/11 – http://www.department.dotag.wa.gov.au/_files/DotAG_Annual_Report_2011.pdf

External links
 

Justice
Attorneys-General of Western Australia
Legal organisations based in Australia
Western Australia